Ashaiman is a town in Ghana. Ashaiman may also refer to:

Ashaiman (Ghana parliament constituency)
Ashaiman Municipal District, the district of which Ashaiman is the capital